Sullivan Township is one of the fifteen townships of Ashland County, Ohio, United States. As of the 2010 census the population was 2,513.

Geography
Located in the northeastern corner of the county, it borders the following townships:
Huntington Township, Lorain County - north
Spencer Township, Medina County - northeast corner
Homer Township, Medina County - east
Jackson Township - southeast
Orange Township - southwest
Troy Township - west
Rochester Township, Lorain County - northwest corner

No municipalities are located in Sullivan Township, although the unincorporated community of Sullivan is located in the center of the township.

Name and history
Sullivan Township was organized in 1819 as part of Medina County, and then became part of Lorain County in December 1822.  It was added to Ashland County when it was formed on February 24, 1846 from portions of Huron, Lorain, Richland, and Wayne counties.

It is the only Sullivan Township statewide.

Government
The township is governed by a three-member board of trustees, who are elected in November of odd-numbered years to a four-year term beginning on the following January 1. Two are elected in the year after the presidential election and one is elected in the year before it. There is also an elected township fiscal officer, who serves a four-year term beginning on April 1 of the year after the election, which is held in November of the year before the presidential election. Vacancies in the fiscal officership or on the board of trustees are filled by the remaining trustees.

References

External links
Township website
County website

Townships in Ashland County, Ohio
1819 establishments in Ohio
Populated places established in 1819
Townships in Ohio